Concrete is the first recording by Fear Factory. The first album to be produced by Ross Robinson, it was intended to be Fear Factory's first release, however the album was shelved after the band declined a record contract presented to the band by Robinson. Subsequently, the album was shelved, with Robinson retaining the master tapes and the band retaining the song rights; half of which were re-recorded a year later and released on their debut album Soul of a New Machine. In 2002, Robinson sold the master tapes to Roadrunner, who subsequently released the album on July 30, 2002, though the band members have had divided opinions on its release.

Background
Concrete was recorded in one week in 1991 in Blackie Lawless's studios. It was intended to be Fear Factory's first release and the first release on a planned record label run by Robinson. The album was recorded on a $5,000 budget, with the album's costs being cut by Robinson and Dino Cazares sneaking into the studio at night to record guitar and bass, which according to Dino gave the album "a $10,000 sound". However, when the band was presented with record contracts by Robinson, the band was advised to not sign the deal, and subsequently the band stopped working with Robinson. Ross subsequently sued the band, and when they were taken to court, Robinson won the rights to the album's master tapes, and the band retained the rights to the songs as well as a DAT tape recording of the album.  Both Fear Factory and Robinson used the album to promote themselves, with Fear Factory using the demo to sign to Roadrunner Records and Ross using the demo to promote his work and attract the attention of local bands, and later of Korn, whom he produced for in 1994 and he would become a heavily sought-after nu metal producer of the 1990s. Burton C. Bell considers the album to be a demo, and the band subsequently used it to improve their songs.

Songs
Eight of the songs on Concrete were re-recorded in 1992 and released on Soul of a New Machine: "Big God/Raped Souls", "Arise Above Oppression", "Crisis", "Escape Confusion", "Dragged Down by the Weight of Existence" (re-recorded as "W.O.E"), "Desecrate", "Suffer Age", and "Self Immolation".

Five of the songs were not re-recorded for Soul of a New Machine, nor re-recorded anywhere else: "Echoes of Innocence", "Deception", "Anxiety", "Piss Christ", and "Ulceration".

The remaining three songs were re-recorded elsewhere: "Sangre de Niños" ("Children's Blood" in Spanish) was re-recorded in 1993 and was included on the Cry Now, Cry Later compilation under the "Factoría de Miedo" moniker, and was the only studio recording to feature then-bassist Andrew Shives; "Concrete" (renamed as "Concreto") was re-recorded in 1995 and was included as a b-side for the "Dog Day Sunrise" single during the Demanufacture era, and was later included on certain editions of the Obsolete album; and "Soulwomb" (renamed as "Soulwound") was re-recorded in 1998 and was included as a b-side for the "Resurrection" single, and was later included on certain editions of the Obsolete album.

"Piss Christ" is not the same song as "Pisschrist", which appears on Demanufacture. "Ulceration" is named after the band's original name. The opening guitar riff in "Echoes of Innocence" was used as a synthesized motif in "A Therapy for Pain", the final track on Demanufacture. The title also appears in that song as a lyric.

Release 
After its shelving, the Concrete demo was never leaked onto the internet. In 2002, following the band's breakup, Ross Robinson sold the master tapes of Concrete to Roadrunner for $10,000. The album was subsequently released under the name Concrete. The band's opinions on its release have been divided. Dino Cazares was happy about the release; "It's something special for the kids, who never even heard it. They can see where we were coming from. Back then, we were gigging in East L.A. We didn't really have too much recording under our belts. We had recorded a couple of demos before that, but we had never worked with a producer like Ross Robinson." Alternatively, Burton C. Bell was annoyed that Robinson had gone behind the band's back to sell the masters without the band's consent.

Track listing

Credits 
Writing, performance and production credits are adapted from the album liner notes.

Personnel

Fear Factory 
 Burton C. Bell − vocals
 Dino Cazares − guitar, bass
 Raymond Herrera − drums
 Andy Romero − bass (credited, but did not perform)

Additional musicians 
 Dave Gibney − spoken word intro on "Big God", vocals on "Raped Souls"

Production 
 Ross Robinson − production, engineering, mixing
 Mikey Davis − engineering, mixing
 Eddy Schreyer − mastering

Visual art 
 t42design – art direction, design
 Howard Rosenberg – photography (cover)
 Rick Ferdinande – photography (band)

Studios 
 Blackie Lawless's Fort Apache Studio, Los Angeles, CA, USA – engineering, mixing
 Oasis Mastering, Los Angeles, CA, USA – mastering

References

Fear Factory albums
1991 albums
2002 albums
Demo albums
Roadrunner Records albums
Albums produced by Ross Robinson